and 911 belly belly

"Belly Dancer (Bananza)" is the fourth single from R&B singer Akon's debut studio album, Trouble. "Belly Dancer (Banaza)" peaked at number 30 on the Billboard Hot 100. Outside of the United States, "Belly Dancer (Bananza)" peaked within the top ten of the charts in the United Kingdom. The song samples "The Lunatics (Have Taken Over the Asylum)" by Fun Boy Three and "Body Rock" by Treacherous Three, and borrows from the chorus of "For What It's Worth" by Buffalo Springfield.  It was used in the 2009 teen comedy film Fired Up!. A remix of the track, featuring Kardinal Offishall, was later included as a B-side to "Pot of Gold".

Music video
In the televised video, Akon goes into a motorbike store and begins daydreaming. He then encounters a pretty girl and follows her into a belly dancing club. There, as the song said, he finds ex-gangsters, and they all flirt. Towards the end of the video, Akon kisses his chosen girl. The online version of the video begins with Akon trying to fall asleep, and awakening upon the video's end. A further version of the video, featuring the remix featuring Kardinal Offshall, was also created.

Track listings

US 12-inch single
A1. "Belly Dancer (Bananza)" (clean) – 4:00
A2. "Belly Dancer (Bananza)" (dirty) – 4:00
A3. "Belly Dancer (Bananza)" (instrumental) – 4:00
B1. "Trouble Nobody" (clean) – 3:22
B2. "Trouble Nobody" (dirty) – 3:23
B3. "Trouble Nobody" (instrumental) – 3:23

UK CD1
 "Belly Dancer (Bananza)"
 "Trouble Nobody" (album version explicit)

UK CD2
 "Belly Dancer (Bananza)" (explicit)
 "Trouble Nobody" (album version explicit)
 "Belly Dancer (Bananza)" (instrumental)
 "Belly Dancer (Bananza)" (video)

UK 12-inch single
A1. "Belly Dancer (Bananza)" (explicit) – 4:00
B1. "Belly Dancer (Bananza)" (instrumental) – 4:00
B2. "Belly Dancer (Bananza)" (a cappella) – 3:55

European CD single
 "Belly Dancer (Bananza)" (radio edit) – 3:12
 "Trouble Nobody" (album version) – 3:23

Australian CD single
 "Belly Dancer (Bananza)" (album version)
 "Trouble Nobody" (album version)
 "Belly Dancer (Bananza)" (instrumental)
 "Belly Dancer (Bananza)" (video)

Charts

Certifications

Release history

Imanbek and Byor version

In 2022, Kazakh DJ and producer Imanbek and Byor released a remix version of the song, which charted in several European countries.

Charts

Weekly charts

Year-end charts

Certifications

References

2004 songs
2005 singles
Akon songs
Song recordings produced by Akon
Songs written by Akon
Songs written by Terry Hall (singer)
SRC Records singles
Universal Records singles